Darko Zec (born 21 February 1989) is a Slovenian footballer who plays as a defender.

Honours

Domžale
Slovenian PrvaLiga: 2007–08
Slovenian Cup: 2010–11
Slovenian Supercup: 2007, 2011

References

External links
Player profile at NZS 

1989 births
Living people
Footballers from Ljubljana
Slovenian footballers
Slovenia youth international footballers
Slovenia under-21 international footballers
Slovenian expatriate footballers
Association football defenders
NK Domžale players
NK Rudar Velenje players
NK Triglav Kranj players
FK Radnik Bijeljina players
NK Bravo players
ND Ilirija 1911 players
SAK Klagenfurt players
Slovenian PrvaLiga players
Slovenian Second League players
Premier League of Bosnia and Herzegovina players
Slovenian expatriate sportspeople in Bosnia and Herzegovina
Expatriate footballers in Bosnia and Herzegovina
Slovenian expatriate sportspeople in Austria
Expatriate footballers in Austria